Matías Nicolás Marín Vega (born 29 December 1999) is a professional footballer who plays as a midfielder for Chilean club O'Higgins.

Club career
He joined Santiago Wanderers Youth Team at the age of 11. He signed his first professional contract on June 30, 2018, but he had made his official debut in the 2018 Primera B match against Cobreloa on June 3. Along with Santiago Wanderers, he got promotion to Chilean Primera División after becoming 2019 Primera B champion.

International career
In 2015, he represented Chile U17 in some friendly matches and Chile U20 at the 2019 South American U-20 Championship, making three appearances.

Honours
Santiago Wanderers
Primera B: 2019

References

External links
 
 Matías Marín at Memoria Wanderers (in Spanish)

1999 births
Living people
Sportspeople from Viña del Mar
Chilean footballers
Chile youth international footballers
Chile under-20 international footballers
Santiago Wanderers footballers
Primera B de Chile players
Chilean Primera División players
Association football midfielders
People from Viña del Mar